was a Japanese video game developer founded on August 14, 1998 in Shibuya, Tokyo, Japan. Dingo was primarily known for the Hatsune Miku: Project DIVA PlayStation Portable games.

Games 
 Online Striker (Microsoft Windows)
 Bleach: Hanatareshi Yabou (PS2, 2006)
 Fire Emblem: Radiant Dawn (Wii, 2007)
 Cluster Edge: Kimi wo Matsu Mirai e no Akashi (PS2, 2007)
 Chō Kōsoku Card Racer (Arcade, 2007)
 Pokémon Battrio (Arcade, 2007)
 Pictdot (2008)
 Kanji Kurouto (2008)
 Kanakuro (2008)
 Number Place (2008)
 Pokémon Battrio 2 (Arcade, 2008)
 Mr. Driller Online (XBLA, 2008)
 Oden-kun: Tanoshii Oden Mura (NDS, 2008)
 Kimo Kawa E! (NDS, 2009)
 PokéPark Wii: Pikachu's Adventure  (Wii, 2009)
 Hatsune Miku: Project DIVA series
 Hatsune Miku: Project DIVA (PSP, 2009)
 Hatsune Miku: Project DIVA 2nd (PSP, 2010)
 Hatsune Miku: Project DIVA Extend (PSP, 2011)
 Photo Kano series
 Photo Kano (PSP, 2012)
 Photo Kano Kiss AR (Vita, 2012)
 Photo Kano Kiss (Vita, 2013)
 Shoukan × Shingeki × Monsters!! (Android, 2012)
 Hikōkai (PSP, 2013)
 Occult Maiden (Android/iOS, 2013)
 Love Live! School Idol Paradise series
 Love Live! School Idol Paradise Vol. 1: Printemps Unit (Vita, 2014)
 Love Live! School Idol Paradise Vol. 2: BiBi Unit (Vita, 2014)
 Love Live! School Idol Paradise Vol. 3: Lily White Unit (Vita, 2014)
 Reco Love series
 Reco Love: Blue Ocean (Vita, 2016)
 Reco Love: Golden Beach (Vita, 2016)
 Ragnastrike Angels (Android/iOS, 2016)

References

External links
  
  

Software companies based in Tokyo
Video game companies established in 1998
Video game companies disestablished in 2017
Defunct video game companies of Japan
Video game development companies
Companies that have filed for bankruptcy in Japan
Japanese companies disestablished in 2017
Japanese companies established in 1998